Ivan Mikulić (born 8 May 1968) is a Herzegovinian Croat singer, best known outside his country for having represented Croatia in the Eurovision Song Contest 2004, singing "You Are The Only One". Mikulić has a large vocal range, which wasn't demonstrated in his performance, and he has incorporated traditional Croatian and Herzegovinian elements in his music such as ganga.

In addition to Eurovision, he has performed in many Croatian music festivals in both Croatia and Bosnia and Herzegovina.

Achievements
Winner of Melodije Mostara music festival – 2006

Sources

External links

1968 births
Living people
Croats of Bosnia and Herzegovina
20th-century Bosnia and Herzegovina male singers
Eurovision Song Contest entrants of 2004
Eurovision Song Contest entrants for Croatia
People from Široki Brijeg
21st-century Croatian male singers